The 3rd United States Infantry Regiment is a regiment of the United States Army. It currently has three active battalions, and is readily identified by its nickname, The Old Guard, as well as Escort to the President. The regimental motto is Noli Me Tangere (from Latin: – "Touch Me Not"). The regiment is a major unit of the Military District of Washington (MDW).

The 3rd is the oldest regiment still active in the Regular Army, having been first organized as the First American Regiment in 1784.  It has been the official ceremonial unit of the U.S. Army since 1948.

Mission
The regiment's mission is to conduct memorial affairs to honor fallen comrades and ceremonies and special events to represent the U.S. Army, communicating its story to United States citizens and the world.

Although The Old Guard primarily functions in a ceremonial role, it is an infantry unit and thus required to meet standards for certification in its combat role. The unit also trains for its support role to civil authorities in a wide range of scenarios and for deployments in support of overseas contingency operations. On order, it conducts defense in support of civil authorities in the National Capital Region and deploys elements in support of overseas contingency operations.

Memorial affairs and ceremonial mission

Memorial affairs missions include standard and full honors funerals in Arlington National Cemetery and dignified transfers at Dover Air Force Base. Old Guard soldiers also perform all dignified transfers of fallen soldiers returning to the United States.

The Old Guard's ceremonial task list includes full honor arrivals for visiting dignitaries, wreath ceremonies at the Tomb of the Unknowns, and full honor reviews in support of senior army leaders and retiring soldiers. Special events include the Twilight Tattoo, a weekly performance in the adjacent Washington area on Wednesday evenings from May to July, and the Spirit of America, a historical pageant presented at three national venues in September.

The Old Guard is the only unit in the U.S. Armed Forces authorized, by a 1922 decree of the War Department, to march with fixed bayonets in all parades. This was granted in honor of the 1847 bayonet charge by the regiment during the Battle of Cerro Gordo in the war with Mexico.

Specialty units
In addition to the marching platoons, there are also elements of The Old Guard that serve special roles unique both to the regiment as well as the U.S. Army. Among these include the sentinels of the Tomb of the Unknown Soldier, maintaining a twenty-four-hour watch over one of the nation's most sacred sites; the Continental Color Guard, which presents the nation's colors at special events across the Capitol Region; the Presidential Salute Battery, which renders honors to senior dignitaries at arrival and wreath ceremonies, reviews, and full honors funerals; and the US Army Caisson Platoon, which provides horses and riders to pull the caisson (the wagon that bears a casket) in military and state funerals.

The Caisson Platoon also provides the riderless horses used in full honors funerals and supports wounded warriors participating in the Therapeutic Riding Program. Other elements of The Old Guard include the Commander-in-Chief's Guard (Company A), replicating the personal guard of General George Washington; wearing Colonial blue uniforms, powdered wigs, and cocked hats; and bearing Brown Bess muskets and halberds at ceremonies and special events; the US Army Drill Team, which demonstrates its skill and precision around the nation, and Old Guard Fife and Drum Corps, which plays traditional arrangements of marching music, dating back to the time of the Continental Army. The Old Guard Fife and Drum Corps marches in Colonial style red coated uniforms—to be "better seen through the smoke of battle"; the uniforms also include cocked hats and white powdered wigs. The drum major of the Fife and Drum Corps traditionally bears an espontoon (a historic pike-like weapon) in his right hand to direct and command his unit. As such, he is the only soldier in all the U.S. Armed Forces authorized to bear a spontoon and to salute with the left hand (although U.S. Navy personnel are allowed to salute with the left hand under certain conditions). Rounding out The Old Guard are the 289th Military Police Company, the 947th Military Working Dog Detachment, the 529th Regimental Support Company, two battalion headquarters companies, and the regimental headquarters company.

Unique badges awarded to specific members of "The Old Guard"

Escort Platoon
Escort Platoon is a term referring to a platoon of soldiers in the U.S. Army's 3d Infantry Regiment whose primary ceremonial mission is to march in ceremonies or military funerals. Generally, line infantry companies delegate the escort role to their 1st platoon. This platoon is generally composed of the tallest soldiers assigned to the unit.

The regiment's Presidential Escort Platoon, Honor Guard Company, is based at Fort Myer. The platoon serves at presidential funerals, inaugurations, Pentagon retirements, state dinners and state visits at the White House, and during presidential speeches in the Rose Garden, among other duties.

Current organization of the 3d Infantry Regiment

Regimental Headquarters and Headquarters Company

 Headquarters and Headquarters Company (HHC)
 Headquarters Platoon
 Coordinating Staff
 RS-1 (Administration)
 RS-2 (Intelligence)
 RS-3 (Operations)
 Chemical, Biological, Radiological, and Nuclear
 Operations
 Drafters and Announcers 
 RS-4 (Logistics)
 Property Book Office
 Ceremonial Equipment Branch
 RS-6 (Communications)
 Communications
 IMO (Information Management Operations
 Legal Office 
 Chaplains Office
 Public Affairs Office
 Regimental Recruiters
 The Old Guard Museum

1st Battalion 3rd US Infantry Regiment
The 1st Battalion is composed of the following units:

 HHC
 Battalion Staff Sections: (S1, S2, S3, S4, S6)
 Caisson Platoon
 Presidential Salute Battery
 Headquarters Platoon
 Company B 
 Escort Platoon
 Casket Platoon
 Firing Party Platoon
 Headquarters Platoon
 Company C
 Escort Platoon
 Casket Platoon
 Firing Party Platoon
 Headquarters Platoon
 Company D
 Escort Platoon
 Casket Platoon
 Firing Party Platoon
 Headquarters Platoon
 Company H
 Escort Platoon
 Casket Platoon
 Firing Party Platoon
 Headquarters Platoon

2nd Battalion 3rd US Infantry Regiment
Stationed at Fort Lewis, Washington, the 2nd Battalion, 3d US Infantry Regiment, serves as one of three infantry battalions of the 1st Stryker Brigade Combat Team of the 7th Infantry Division. After a 31-year hiatus from service, the 2nd Battalion was reactivated on 15 March 2001 as part of the U.S. Army's first Stryker brigade (inactive) combat team. It served as part of the first deployment of a Stryker brigade combat team in 2003. It then served a 15-month deployment in 2006–2007. It deployed to Iraq again in 2009 and Afghanistan in 2011. From 1966 to 1970, the 2nd Battalion was part of the 199th Light Infantry Brigade and 23d Infantry Division in Vietnam. The 2nd Battalion has the following units:

 HHC
 Scout Platoon
 Mortar Platoon
 Medical Platoon
 Battalion Staff Sections: (S1, S2, S3, S4, S6)
 Company A
 First Platoon
 Second Platoon
 Third Platoon
 Mortar Section
 Company B 
 First Platoon
 Second Platoon
 Third Platoon
 Mortar Section
 Company C
 First Platoon
 Second Platoon
 Third Platoon
 Mortar Section
 Company G
 Headquarters/Field Feeding Team Platoon
 Maintenance Platoon
 Distribution Platoon

4th Battalion 3rd US Infantry Regiment
From 1966 to 1974, the 4th Battalion was part of the 11th and 198th Infantry Brigades and 23d Infantry Division in Vietnam. The 4th Battalion was reactivated at Fort Myer in 2008.

The 4th Battalion is composed of the following units:

 HHC
 Tomb Guards, the Tomb of the Unknown Soldier
 The United States Army Drill Team
 Battalion Staff Sections: (S1, S2, S3, S4, S6)
 Company A (Commander-In-Chief's Guard)
 Three Colonial Marching Platoons
 Company E (Honor Guard Company)
 Escort Platoon
 Casket Platoon
 Firing Party
 Continental Color Guard
 289th Military Police Company
 Special Reaction Team
 947th Military Police Detachment (K-9)
 The Old Guard Fife and Drum Corps
 529th Regimental Support Company
 Headquarters Section
 Food Service Platoon
 Maintenance Platoon
 Transportation Platoon
 Medical Platoon

Operational history

Early years
The Old Guard traces its history to the First American Regiment organized in 1784 under command of Lieutenant Colonel Josiah Harmar, a veteran of the American Revolution. The 1st Infantry saw its first combat in an unsuccessful campaign against the Miami tribe near modern-day Fort Wayne, Indiana in 1790. This was followed by devastating losses at St. Clair's Defeat in 1791.

In 1792 the United States Army was reorganized into the Legion of the United States, with the 1st Infantry forming the nucleus of the 1st Sub-Legion. (Sub-Legions were the remote ancestors of today's Brigade Combat Teams, with organic Infantry, Cavalry and Artillery units.) On 20 August 1794, along with the most of the Legion's units under the command of Major General Anthony Wayne, the 1st Sub-Legion was engaged at the decisive victory of the Legion over the Miamis at the Battle of Fallen Timbers.

In 1795 the Legion was reorganized along more traditional lines and reverted to being called the United States Army. In the reorganization the 1st Sub-Legion was redesignated as the 1st Infantry Regiment.

As of 1805, six of the regiment's ten companies were in St. Louis, Missouri, with the other four located at Fort Massac, Fort Dearborn, Fort Adams, Mississippi and Fort Wayne in Detroit.

War of 1812 and reorganization of the Army
During the War of 1812 the 1st Infantry served in Upper Canada and saw action at the battles of Chippewa and Lundy's Lane. These actions give the regiment campaign credit for the War of 1812.

After the end of the War of 1812 in early 1815, the Army had a total of 44 Infantry regiments which were consolidated into only eight regiments. Rather than preserving the existing designations of the Army's oldest units, it was decided instead to consolidate units based on their geographic proximity rather than seniority.  On May 17, 1815, the 1st Infantry was consolidated with five other regiments to form the 3rd Infantry.  This is why the 3rd Infantry is the oldest Infantry unit in the active United States Army rather than the 1st Infantry.

1815 to 1861
As of 30 November 1819, the regiment was located on the northwestern frontier at Fort Howard in Green Bay, Wisconsin. As of 9 November 1822, the regiment had 6 companies in Green Bay, two in Sarnac and two in Chicago.

The annual report of the Army from 1826 showed that the regiment had been re-located to Jefferson Barracks, Missouri.

As of November 1837, the regiment's headquarters and six companies were at Fort Jesup in Louisiana with the other four companies at Fort Towson in Oklahoma.

From 1840 to 1843, the 3rd Infantry fought in the Seminole War in Florida.

During the Mexican War, the regiment fought in most of the major battles of the war including Palo Alto, Monterey, the invasion and Siege of Vera Cruz, Cerro Gordo, Churubusco and Chapultepec which led to the capture and occupation of Mexico City.

From 1856 to 1860, the regiment served in New Mexico where it fought the Navajo Indian tribe.

After serving in New Mexico, the regiment was spread out to various posts on the Gulf of Mexico from Florida to Texas.

American Civil War
The 3rd Infantry saw extensive service during the United States Civil War and was credited with 12 campaigns. Detachments from the regiment were serving at Fort Pickens in Florida and in Saluria on the Gulf Coast of Texas when the war began in April 1861. Three companies of the 3rd Infantry surrendered on 25 April. Five of the regiment's 10 companies were engaged at the Battle of Bull Run on 20 July 1861.

The regiment spent most of the war assigned to the Army of the Potomac and served mostly in Virginia. From May 1862 to March 1864, it served with 1st Brigade, 2nd Division of the 5th Corps. In March 1864, it was reassigned to the 4th Brigade, 1st Division of the 5th Corps. It participated in the Siege of Yorktown (part of the Peninsular Campaign), the Battle of Malvern Hill, the Second Battle of Bull Run, the Battle of Antietam, the Battle of Fredericksburg, the Battle of Chancellorsville, the Battle of Gettysburg, the Battle of Cold Harbor and the Battle of Appomattox.

1865 to 1917
After the Civil War, the 3rd Infantry served in Kansas, Colorado and the Indian Territory (later the state of Oklahoma) from 1866 to 1874. It then served in Louisiana and Mississippi from 1874 to 1877, and Montana, Minnesota and South Dakota from 1877 to 1898.

During the Spanish–American War, the regiment served in Cuba from 14 June – 25 August 1898, where it participated in the Santiago Campaign and fought at the Battle of San Juan Hill.

After returning from Cuba, the 3rd Infantry was stationed at Fort Snelling in Minnesota. On 5 October 1898, a force of about 80 men—including soldiers of the 3rd Infantry, U.S. Marshals and Indian Police—fought in the Battle of Sugar Point against 17 members of the local Pillager Band of Chippewa Indians near the Leech Lake Reservation. The United States forces lost 6 soldiers and one Indian Police officer killed and another 14 wounded. There were no casualties among the Chippewa. Hospital Steward (later Major) Oscar Burkard received the Medal of Honor for rescuing casualties during the battle. The Battle of Sugar Point was the last battle fought between the United States Army and Native Americans.

The 3rd Infantry also served in the Philippines during the Philippine Insurrection from 3 February 1899, to 15 April 1902. It then returned to the United States where it was stationed in Kentucky, Ohio and Illinois. It was then sent to Alaska where it served from 1 July 1904, to 6 August 1906, when it was sent to Washington state until it was sent back to the Philippines about 1909.

As of August 1914 the regiment's headquarters, along with the 2nd and 3rd Battalions, were located at Madison Barracks, New York. The 1st Battalion was located at Fort Ontario, New York.

Mexican Border and World War I
In 1916, the 3rd Infantry, then commanded by Colonel Julius Penn, was sent to the Texas-Mexico Border during the Pancho Villa Expedition and guarded against a possible invasion.  One of the regiment's officers at this time was 2nd Lieutenant James Van Fleet, who graduated West Point in 1915 and would rise to four-star general during the Korean War.

During World War I, the headquarters of the 3rd Infantry, along with the 3rd Battalion, was posted at Camp Eagle Pass in Texas. The 1st Battalion was located at Del Rio, Texas and the 2nd Battalion was at Fort Sam Houston. Throughout the war the regiment was assigned to patrolling the Mexican Border and did not see action.

During World War I, recent West Point graduate Captain Matthew Ridgway was assigned to the 3rd Infantry. Ridgway would go on to have a highly distinguished 38-year career including assignments as commander of the 82nd Airborne Division, XVIII Airborne Corps, 8th United States Army, United Nations Command Korea, Supreme Allied Commander Europe and Chief of Staff of the United States Army.

Interwar period (1919–39)
Following the establishment of the United States Border Patrol, the 3rd Infantry was relocated to Camp Sherman in Ohio on 14 October 1920. The regiment marched 941 miles from Camp Sherman to Fort Snelling, Minnesota, arriving on 17 November 1921. Upon arrival the 2nd and 3rd Battalions were inactivated on 18 November 1921, and the 1st Battalion assumed garrison duties. The regiment was re-organized as a combat regiment when the 2nd and 3rd Battalions were re-activated on 8 June 1922.

On 24 March 1923, the regiment was assigned to the 7th Division. On 15 August 1927 the regiment was reassigned to the 6th Division.

On 1 October 1933, the regiment reverted to being assigned to the 7th Division. On 22 April 1939 the regiment conducted a review for Crown Prince Frederick and Princess Ingrid of Denmark.

World War II
During World War II, the 3d Infantry served most of the war as a separate regiment and was not assigned to a combat division until 50 days before the German surrender.

On 16 October 1939, it was relieved from assignment to the 7th Division and assigned to the 6th Division at Fort Jackson, South Carolina. In November 1940, the 1st Battalion was relocated to Fort Crook, Nebraska. The regiment was relieved from assignment to the 6th Division on 10 May 1941. The 3d Battalion departed from New York on 20 January 1941 and was sent to St. Johns, Newfoundland before moving to Fort Pepperrell in the Newfoundland Base Command in November 1941.

The 1st Battalion was inactivated 1 June 1941 at Fort Leonard Wood, Missouri, with its soldiers being assigned to the 63rd Infantry and was re-activated 14 February 1942 in Newfoundland. The remainder of the regiment was sent to Camp Ripley, Minnesota, on 13 September 1941 and returned to Fort Snelling on 26 September.

When the United States declared war on Japan in December 1941, the regiment was stationed at Fort Snelling. The 2nd Battalion was inactivated 1 September 1942 at Fort Snelling.

The regiment arrived in Boston on 17 September 1943 and moved to Camp Butner, North Carolina, on 22 September 1943 where it was attached to the XII Corps. The 2nd Battalion was re-activated on 22 October 1943 at Camp Butner. The regiment was moved to Fort Benning, Georgia, on 8 March 1944, where it provided cadre for the Infantry School.

Late in the war, the regiment staged at Camp Myles Standish, near Taunton, Massachusetts, on 27 February 1945, and departed from Boston bound for France on 8 March 1945.

The regiment arrived in Le Havre, France on 18 March 1945, and was attached to the reconstituted 106th Infantry Division with the mission of containing the isolated German garrison at St. Nazaire. The regiment moved with the 106th Division into Germany on 26 April 1945 — twelve days before the surrender of Germany — and processed prisoners of war. The regiment was then assigned to duty in the occupation of Germany and was located at Babenhausen. The 3d Infantry was inactivated on 20 November 1946 in Berlin.

The 3d Infantry was credited with the American Theater streamer for its defense of Newfoundland. It was also credited with the European Theater Northern France Campaign streamer, even though the Northern France Campaign technically ended on 14 September 1944.  However theater commanders were authorized to award Campaign Participation Credit to select campaigns even after the technical end of that campaign, the Northern France Campaign being one of those, since the 3rd Infantry Regiment assisted with the mission of containing the German Garrison at St.Nazaire.

Post World War II
The 3d Infantry Regiment (less the 2nd Battalion) was re-activated on 6 April 1948 at Fort Myer, Virginia. The 2nd Battalion was concurrently re-activated at Fort Lesley J. McNair, Washington, D.C. This was when the unit assumed the role it is best known for today as the official ceremonial unit of the United States Army. The regiment's reactivation was shortly before the state funeral of General of the Armies John J. Pershing held on 19 July 1948 in which soldiers of the 3d Infantry played a prominent role. This was the beginning of the 3d Infantry's current mission of performing ceremonial duties in the Washington, D.C. area.

The Old Guard gained national attention for the support it provided to the state funeral of President John F. Kennedy in November 1963. Aside from the Kennedy funeral, the Old Guard has also supported state funerals for the Unknown Soldiers of World War II, Korea and Vietnam as well as presidents Herbert Hoover, Dwight D. Eisenhower, Lyndon B. Johnson, Ronald Reagan and Gerald R. Ford. Other persons who have received state funerals the Old Guard has supported included General John J. Pershing, General Douglas MacArthur, Vice President Hubert Humphrey and Medal of Honor recipient Senator Daniel Inouye.

Aside from supporting military and state funerals, the 3d Infantry also assumed the responsibility for providing the guard detail at the Tomb of the Unknown Soldier in Arlington National Cemetery and for providing honor guards at the White House for high ranking dignitaries.

Subordinate battalions
The 3d Battalion of the 3d Infantry, from 1963 until its inactivation in 1994, was one of the three light infantry battalions that made up the Army Reserve's 205th Infantry Brigade (Light) (Separate), which in turn was the round-out brigade for the Regular Army's 6th Infantry Division (Light), based at Fort Richardson and Fort Wainwright, Alaska. The 205th Infantry Brigade was headquartered at Fort Snelling, Minnesota, until its inactivation. It was inactivated on 25 August 1994. The 3d Battalion was scheduled to activate at Fort Carson as part of the 5th IBCT/4th Infantry Division. The activation was cancelled when the army froze at 45 brigades.

The 5th Battalion was activated on 24 November 1967 and assigned to the 6th Infantry Division at Fort Campbell, Kentucky. It was relieved from assignment to the 6th Infantry Division on 24 July 1968, and inactivated on 21 July 1969 at Fort Campbell, Kentucky.

The 6th Battalion was activated on 24 November 1967 and assigned to the 6th Infantry Division at Fort Campbell, Kentucky. It was relieved from assignment to the 6th Infantry Division on 24 July 1968, and inactivated on 1 February 1969 at Fort Campbell, Kentucky.

The 7th Battalion was activated on 24 November 1967 and assigned to the 6th Infantry Division at Fort Campbell, Kentucky. It was relieved from assignment to the 6th Infantry Division on 24 July 1968, and inactivated on 25 July, concurrent with the inactivation of the 6th Infantry Division at Fort Campbell, Kentucky.

The 2nd Battalion in Vietnam (1966-1970)
On 1 June 1966, the 2nd Battalion was activated at Fort Benning, Georgia and assigned to the 199th Light Infantry Brigade (199th LIB). The 199th LIB deployed to South Vietnam in December 1966 operating throughout III Corps. 

On 3 July 1969 while Company D, 2nd Battalion was patrolling in Long Khanh Province during Operation Toan Thang III it was ambushed by the People's Army of Vietnam 33rd Regiment losing nine killed including Corporal Michael Fleming Folland who smothered an enemy hand grenade with his body, he was later posthumously awarded the Medal of Honor. 

The 199th LIB returned to the United States in 1970 and the 2nd Battalion was inactivated on 15 October 1970 at Fort Benning.

The 4th Battalion in Vietnam (1967–68)
The 4th Battalion of The Old Guard was officially activated at Schofield Barracks, Hawaii, on 1 July 1966, and commanded by LTC Harold J. Meyer. The battalion consisted initially of Headquarters and Headquarters Company and A Company, containing one officer/five enlisted men and twenty one enlisted men respectively. By 31 December 1966, the battalion strength had increased to 37 officers, two warrant officers and 492 enlisted men.

When the battalion was reactivated, it utilized facilities formerly occupied by elements of the 25th infantry Division. During the period of 1 July 1966 through 10 September 1966, the battalion conducted preparation for Basic Unit Training since most of the Old Guard's lower enlisted personnel had never served with a regular unit. The non-commissioned officers, on the other hand, were greatly experienced with many recent returns from Vietnam.

During its preparation for service in South Vietnam, the 4th Battalion was assigned to the 11th Infantry Brigade. On 15 August 1967, the 11th Infantry Brigade adopted the "light Infantry" concept. By selecting one rifle platoon and personnel from the weapons platoon from each line company, an additional line company, delta, was introduced to the battalion. Further by removing the 4.2" mortar and reconnaissance platoons and the ground surveillance section from the former headquarters company, a combat support company, Echo, was created with these two changes to the battalion, the revised strength authorization totaled 44 officers, 1 warrant officer and 886 enlisted men.

On 7 July 1967, the battalion conducted a farewell review for its departing commander, Lieutenant Colonel Meyer and simultaneously Major C. Hartsfield assumed interim command of the battalion. On 20 July, the battalion welcomed Lieutenant Colonel Alvin E. Adkins as its new commander. Adkins had previously served in World War II, the Korean and Vietnam Wars.

On 25 December, personnel of the advance party, including LTC Adkins, the company commanders and additional key staff members departed by aircraft for South Vietnam. After 14 days at sea, the main body arrived at Qui Nhon harbor and proceeded by vehicle convoy north along Highway 1 to Đức Phổ Base Camp and a base of operations known as Carentan. In-country training and combat operations commenced immediately, throughout the remainder of 1967 the battalion conducted search and destroy missions outside Carentan and to the west of Đức Phổ.

On 16 March, Company B was landed by helicopters near Mỹ Khê, Quảng Ngãi Province and proceeded to kill between 60 and 155 civilians in the My Lai Massacre.

Global War on Terrorism
On 12 November 2003, the 2nd Battalion deployed to Iraq with the 3d Brigade (Stryker), 2nd Infantry Division to begin a tour of duty in support of Operation Iraqi Freedom. This was the first deployment of an element of The Old Guard since the Vietnam War. Operating first in the dangerous Sunni Triangle area under command of the 4th Infantry Division, the soldiers of the 2nd Battalion, 3rd Infantry relieved troops of the 101st Airborne Division in January 2004 in northern Iraq. The 2nd Battalion began redeployment back to the United States in October 2004.

Another historic event occurred on 15 December 2003, when Bravo Company of the 1st Battalion deployed from Fort Myer, Virginia, for duty in the U.S. Central Command area of operations. This was the first deployment of an element of The Old Guard's 1st Battalion since World War II. Bravo Company, also called Task Force Bravo and Team Battlehard, arrived in the US Central Command area of operations to take up duty in Djibouti on the Horn of Africa on 17 December 2003. The soldiers of The Old Guard served in support of Combined Joint Task Force-Horn of Africa (CJTF-HOA) and Operation Enduring Freedom. Based at Camp Lemonnier, their missions in the region included force protection to civil affairs and engineer personnel, engaging in joint operations with other U.S. and regional military forces and constant training to stay prepared. Team Battlehard redeployed back to Fort Myer in July 2004.

In 2007, 1st Battalion's Delta Company was deployed to Camp Lemonnier, Djibouti as part of CJTF-HOA, supporting humanitarian missions and local military training in the region.

Charlie Company, 1st Battalion deployed to Camp Taji, Iraq, in 2009 to execute its theater internment support mission.

In December 2011, 2nd Battalion deployed to Kandahar Province in Afghanistan, where they were responsible for providing base security for U.S. Army Special Forces and U.S. Navy SEALs who were engaged in village stability operations.

Current duties
The Old Guard's current duties include, but are not limited to, providing funeral details at Arlington National Cemetery, guarding the Tomb of the Unknown Soldier, providing honor guards for visiting dignitaries, supporting official ceremonies and providing a quick reaction force for the Washington, D.C. metropolitan area.

As of 2018, there were three active battalions of the 3d Infantry Regiment.

 1st Battalion assigned to the Military District of Washington, Fort Myer, Virginia
 2nd Battalion assigned to the 1st Stryker Brigade Combat Team, 2nd Infantry Division,  JBLM, Washington
 4th Battalion assigned to the Military District of Washington, Fort Myer, Virginia

Medals of Honor

The following 3d Infantry soldiers have been awarded the Medal of Honor:
 Indian Wars
Sergeant James Fegan, Company H, March 1868, Plum Creek, Kansas

Corporal Leander Herron, Company A, 2 September 1868, near Fort Dodge, Kansas

Hospital Steward Oscar Burkard of the U.S. Army Hospital Corps, attached to the 3d U.S. Infantry, received the Medal of Honor for his actions on 5 October 1898 in the Battle of Sugar Point at Leech Lake, Minnesota. It is listed by the U.S. Office of Medical History as the last Medal of Honor awarded in an Indian campaign.

 Vietnam War
Corporal Michael Fleming Folland, Company D, 2nd Battalion, 3 July 1969, Long Khanh (posthumous)

Notable members of the regiment

 Major General and President William Henry Harrison
 Major General and President Zachary Taylor
 General Matthew Ridgway
 General James Van Fleet
 Major General Benjamin Bonneville
 Major General Harry J. Collins
 Major General George W. Getty
 Major General Ethan A. Hitchcock
 Brigadier General Thomas S. Jesup
 Brigadier General Zebulon Pike
 Brigadier General Thomas Humphrey Cushing
 Brigadier General Julius Penn
 Brevet Brigadier General Josiah Harmar
 Brevet Brigadier General Henry Leavenworth
 Colonel John F. Hamtramck
 Colonel Thomas Hunt
 Colonel Jacob Kingsbury
 Colonel George K. McGunnegle
 Colonel William Whistler
 Major David Ziegler
 Captain Merriwether Lewis
 First Lieutenant Tom Cotton
 Corporal Charlotte Clymer
 Black Jack (horse)
 Sergeant York (horse)

Lineage
 Constituted 3 June 1784 in the Regular Army as the First American Regiment to consist of companies from Connecticut, New York, New Jersey, and Pennsylvania.
 Organized August–September 1784 in Pennsylvania and New Jersey (New York and Connecticut companies organized in 1785)
 Redesignated 29 September 1789 as the Regiment of Infantry
 Redesignated 3 March 1791 as the 1st Infantry Regiment
 Redesignated in 1792 as the Infantry of the 1st Sub-Legion
 Redesignated 31 October 1796 as the 1st Infantry Regiment
 Consolidated May–October 1815 with the 5th Infantry Regiment (constituted 12 April 1808), the 17th Infantry Regiment (constituted 11 January 1812), the 19th Infantry Regiment (constituted 26 June 1812), and the 28th Infantry Regiment (constituted 29 January 1813) to form the 3rd Infantry (The 17th and 19th Infantry Regiments had been consolidated with the 26th and 27th Infantry Regiments on 12 May 1814)
 Consolidated August–December 1869 with one-half of the 37th Infantry Regiment (see ANNEX) and consolidated unit designated as the 3rd Infantry
 2nd and 3rd Battalions inactivated 18 November 1921 at Fort Snelling, Minnesota; activated 8 June 1922 at Fort Snelling, Minnesota
 Assigned 24 March 1923 to the 7th Division
 Relieved 15 August 1927 from assignment to the 7th Division and assigned to the 6th Division
 Relieved 1 October 1933 from assignment to the 6th Division and assigned to the 7th Division
 Relieved 16 October 1939 from assignment to the 7th Division and assigned to the 6th Division
 Relieved 10 May 1941 from assignment to the 6th Division
 (1st Battalion inactivated 1 June 1941 at Fort Leonard Wood, Missouri; activated 14 February 1942 in Newfoundland)
 (2nd Battalion (less Headquarters and Headquarters Company) inactivated 1 September 1942 at Fort Snelling, Minnesota (Headquarters and Headquarters Company concurrently inactivated in Greenland); battalion activated 22 October 1943 at Camp Butner, North Carolina)
 Inactivated 20 November 1946 in Germany
 Regiment (less 2nd Battalion) activated 6 April 1948 at Fort Myer, Virginia (2nd Battalion concurrently activated at Fort Lesley J. McNair, Washington, D.C.)
 Reorganized 1 July 1957 as a parent regiment under the Combat Arms Regimental System
 Withdrawn 16 January 1986 from the Combat Arms Regimental System and reorganized under the United States Army Regimental System
 Redesignated 1 October 2005 as the 3d Infantry Regiment

ANNEX
37th Infantry Regiment
 Constituted 3 May 1861 in the Regular Army as the 3d Battalion, 19th Infantry Regiment.
 Organized May 1865 – September 1866 at Fort Wayne, Michigan; Newport Barracks, Kentucky; and Fort Columbus, New York
 3d Battalion, 19th Infantry, reorganized and redesignated 23 November 1866 as the 37th Infantry Regiment.
 One-half of the 37th Infantry consolidated August–December 1869 with the 3rd Infantry and consolidated unit designated as the 3d Infantry (remaining half of the 37th Infantry consolidated in June 1869 with the 5th Infantry and consolidated unit designated as the 5th Infantry—hereafter separate lineage)

Honors

Campaign participation credit

War of 1812

 Canada
 Chippewa
 Lundy's Lane

Mexican–American War

 Palo Alto
 Resaca de la Palma
 Monterey
 Vera Cruz
 Cerro Gordo
 Contreras
 Churubusco
 Chapultepec

American Civil War

 Bull Run
 Peninsula
 Manassas
 Antietam
 Fredericksburg
 Chancellorsville
 Gettysburg
 Appomattox
 Texas 1861
 Florida 1861
 Florida 1862
 Virginia 1863

Indian Wars

 Miami (Ohio, 1791–1794)
 Seminoles (Florida, 1840–1843)
 New Mexico 1856
 New Mexico 1857
 New Mexico 1858
 New Mexico 1860
 Comanches (Oklahoma, 1868)
 Montana 1887 (Nez Perce)

Spanish–American War
 Santiago

Philippine Insurrection

 Malolos
 San Isidro
 Luzon 1899
 Luzon 1900
 Jolo 1911

One of the more active company grade officers was Captain James McCrae who, as Major General, commanded the 78th Division in the St. Mihiel and Meuse-Argonne offensive in World War I.

World War II
 American Theater, Streamer without inscription;
 Northern France

Vietnam

 Counteroffensive, Phase II
 Counteroffensive, Phase III
 Tet Counteroffensive
 Counteroffensive, Phase IV
 Counteroffensive, Phase V
 Counteroffensive, Phase VI
 Tet 69/Counteroffensive
 Summer-Fall 1969
 Winter-Spring 1970
 Sanctuary Counteroffensive
 Counteroffensive, Phase VII
 Consolidation I

War on Terrorism
Iraq War
 Iraqi Sovereignty

Decorations

 Presidential Unit Citation, 6–7 September 1968 (earned by Reconnaissance Platoon, Company E, 4th Battalion)
 Valorous Unit Award, Streamer embroidered SAIGON - LONG BINH (earned by 2d Battalion)
 Valorous Unit Award, Streamer embroidered KARBALA AND AN NAJAF, IRAQ (earned by 2d Battalion)
 Meritorious Unit Commendation (Army), Streamer embroidered WASHINGTON, D.C., 1969-1973 (earned by 1st Battalion)
 Meritorious Unit Commendation (Army), Streamer embroidered IRAQ 2003-2004 (earned by 2d Battalion)
 Meritorious Unit Commendation (Army), Streamer embroidered IRAQ 2006-2007 (earned by 2d Battalion)
 Meritorious Unit Commendation (Army), Streamer embroidered IRAQ 2009-2010 (earned by 2d Battalion)
 Meritorious Unit Commendation (Army), Streamer embroidered AFGHANISTAN 2011-2012 (earned by 2d Battalion)
 Army Superior Unit Award, Streamer embroidered 1984-1985 (earned by 1st Battalion)
 Army Superior Unit Award, Streamer embroidered 1993 (earned by 1st Battalion)
 Army Superior Unit Award, Streamer embroidered 2002-2003 (earned by 2d Battalion)
 Army Superior Unit Award, Streamer embroidered 2004-2005 (earned by 1st Battalion)
 Army Superior Unit Award, Streamer embroidered 2011-2013 (earned by 1st and 4th Battalions)
 Republic of Vietnam Gallantry Cross with Palm, 1968-1970 (earned by 2d and 4th Battalions)
 Republic of Vietnam Civil Actions Honor Medal, First Class, 1966-1970 (earned by 2d Battalion)

In popular culture
Gardens of Stone is a 1987 American drama film directed by Francis Ford Coppola, based on the novel of the same title by Nicholas Proffitt. It stars James Caan, Anjelica Huston, James Earl Jones and D. B. Sweeney. The movie, set in 1968 and 1969, attempts to examine the meaning of the Vietnam War entirely through the eyes of the members of "The Old Guard", the stateside-based elite Army unit whose duties include Presidential escorts and military funerals at Arlington.

See also
 List of United States Regular Army Civil War units

References

Bibliography

 U.S. Army. "Regimental Home". (U.S. military website.) 3rd United States Infantry Regiment. Retrieved on 18 October 2009.
 First American Regiment at ArmyHistory.org.  Accessed on 10 August 2008
 McKeeby, Eric M. (30 June 2004.) "MDW commander visits deployed Old Guard unit". (U.S. military website.) US Military District of Washington PAO. Retrieved on 4 October 2007.
 McKeeby, Eric M. (11 May 2004.) "U.S. Army Capt. Michael J. Trotter: Company commander juggles Old Guard's diverse missions in Africa". (U.S. military website.) Defend America. Retrieved on 4 October 2007.
 (22 May 1997.) "Lineage and honors information: 3rd Infantry (the Old Guard)". (U.S. military website.) United States Army Center of Military History. Retrieved on 4 October 2007. 
 
 Eanes, Colonel Greg. (2013). "The Old Guard in the Philippine Insurrection". Retrieved on 8 February 2014

External links

 History of the 3rd Regiment of Infantry 
 
 
 
 The promotion of Private David Radford Martin, of Gray, Knox County, Kentucky to Corporal, of Company C, 3rd US Regiment of Infantry, on 19 January 1914 at Madison Barracks, Jefferson County, New York
 Ethan Morse (11 Nov 2021) The Mistake That Haunts This Guard of the Tomb of the Unknown Soldier Morse (served 2001-2006) films a series on The Old Guard, including Staff Sergeant Adam Dickmeyer

Military units and formations established in 1784
0003
United States Regular Army Civil War units and formations
Military units and formations of the United States in the Philippine–American War
Military units and formations of the United States in the Spanish–American War
Military units and formations of the United States in the Indian Wars
Infantry regiments of the United States Army in World War II
003d Infantry Regiment
1784 establishments in the United States
Guards regiments
Ceremonial units of the United States military